The 2010 Rink Hockey European Championship or 2010 CERH European Championship was the 49th edition of the Rink Hockey European Championship, held between 5 and 11 September, in Wuppertal, Germany.

Venue
All games were played at Wuppertal's Uni-Halle, with a maximum capacity of 2,500 for rink hockey games.

Group stage 

All times are Central European Summer Time (UTC+1).

Group A

Group B

Knockout stage 

All times are Central European Summer Time (UTC+1).

Quarter-finals

Semi-finals

Third-place play-off 

France win 2-0 on penalties

Final

Placement matches 

All times are Central European Summer Time (UTC+1).

5th to 8th place

7th-place play-off

5th-place play-off

Final ranking

Goalscorers 
Below is a list of all of the tournament's goalscorers:

14 goals
  Ricardo Oliveira
11 goals
  Luís Viana
  Pedro Gil
10 goals
  Jordi Bargalló
9 goals
  Reinaldo Ventura
8 goals
  Josep Ma Ordeig
  Marc Torra
  Pascal Kissling
6 goals
  Jens Behrendt
  Ricardo Barreiros
  Jordi Adroher
5 goals
  Juan Travasino
  James Taylor

4 goals
  Marco Bernadowitz
  Sergio Festa
  Davide Motaran
  Francesco de Rinaldis
  Tiago Rafael
  Pedro Moreira
  Andre Azevedo
  Marc Waddingham
  Andreas Münger
  Dominik Wirth
3 goals
  Guirec Henry
  Kevin Guilbert
  Anthony Weber
  Marc Gual
  Josep Ma Roca
  Simon von Allmen
  Simon Hosking
  Owen Stewart
  Michael Witzemann

2 goals
  Mark Wochnik
  Valter Neves
  Brandan Barker
  Sébastien
1 goal
  Thomas Simcic
  Michael Schwendinger
  Karl Smith
  Kai Hövelmann
  Andreas Paczia
  Luca Serpini
  Antonio Dagostino
  Domenico Illuzzi
  Olivier Lesca
  Nicolas Guilbert
  Roma Bancells

References

External links
Official Website of Euro 2010 Wuppertal

Rink Hockey Euro 2010 Wuppertal Information
Comité Européen de Rink-Hockey CERH website

 

CERH European Roller Hockey Championship
Rink Hockey European Championship
Rink Hockey European Championship
European Championship
September 2010 sports events in Germany